Leonard Donald "Len" Hopkins (June 12, 1930 – February 6, 2007) was a Canadian politician and member of the Liberal Party of Canada.

Biography
Born in Argyle, Ontario, Hopkins was educated at the Ryerson Institute of Technology, the North Bay Teacher's College, as well as receiving a B.A. from Queen's University and a teacher's certificate from the Ontario College of Education at the University of Toronto. He was a teacher and school principal and served on the municipal council for Petawawa Township from 1963 to 1965.

Hopkins represented the electoral districts of Renfrew North from 1965 to 1972, Renfrew North—Nipissing East from 1972 to 1979 and Renfrew—Nipissing—Pembroke from 1979 to 1997, in the House of Commons of Canada.

He served as Parliamentary Secretary to the Minister of Energy, Mines and Resources from 1972 to 1975 and the Minister of National Defence in 1984. He "battled his own party" over the Canadian gun registry.

Hopkins died on February 6, 2007, in the University of Ottawa Heart Institute, aged 76. He had suffered a series of cardiac setbacks. His death was attributed to pneumonia.

References

External links

Leonard Donald Hopkins fonds at Queen's University Archives

1930 births
2007 deaths
Canadian Presbyterians
Liberal Party of Canada MPs
Members of the House of Commons of Canada from Ontario
People from Kawartha Lakes
People from Renfrew County
Queen's University at Kingston alumni
University of Toronto alumni
Deaths from pneumonia in Ontario